Valdian Rural District is in Ivughli District of Khoy County, West Azerbaijan province, Iran. At the National Census of 2006, its population was 6,220 in 1,504 households. There were 5,947 inhabitants in 1,745 households at the following census of 2011. At the most recent census of 2016, the population of the rural district was 5,636 in 1,730 households. The largest of its 11 villages was Valdian, with 1,572 people. It is home to Iran's nuclear facilities.

References 

Khoy County

Rural Districts of West Azerbaijan Province

Populated places in West Azerbaijan Province

Populated places in Khoy County